Yes I Smoke Crack is the debut release from Michigan and Chicago-based band Salem. Gaining fast popularity, the EP, limited to 500, sold out in pre-sales. The EP was pressed on white vinyl. A video for the song "Dirt" was produced by the band, and gathered public interest due to its odd setting. In an interview with Butt Magazine, John Holland stated that the name of the EP was something he may have seen somewhere, and that he just felt it was the right name, in summary.

Track list
"Redlights" – 3:38
"Snakes" – 2:21
"Deepburn" – 2:29
"Dirt" – 3:21

References

2008 EPs
Salem (American band) albums
Electronic EPs